Hugo Horacio Sequeira Soza (born 30 September 1995 in Salto) is an Uruguayan footballer who plays for Rampla Juniors.

Club career
Sequeira started his career playing with Danubio. He made his professional debut during the 2013/14 season.

References

External links
 Profile at Soccerway
 Profile at Footballdatabase

1995 births
Living people
Footballers from Salto, Uruguay
Uruguayan footballers
Association football forwards
Danubio F.C. players
Centro Atlético Fénix players
Cerro Largo F.C. players
Club Atlético River Plate (Montevideo) players
C.A. Rentistas players
Rampla Juniors players
2015 South American Youth Football Championship players